The Consul-General from the United Kingdom in Shanghai is the United Kingdom's diplomatic representative within the city of Shanghai in the People's Republic of China. From 1842 to 1949 the Consul-General's office and residence was located in the British Consulate General in Shanghai on the Bund; from 1985 to 2014 in the Shanghai Centre on Nanjing West Road; and from December 2014 in the new British Centre on West Beijing Road.

List of Consuls-General

Consuls, 1842–1880

Consuls-General, 1880–1958

British Consul attached to the Shanghai Overseas Chinese Affairs Commissioner, 1958–1967

Consuls-General, 1985–present

See also 

 Former Consulate-General of the United Kingdom, Shanghai
 British Supreme Court for China

Notes

References

External links
British Consulate-General Shanghai

China–United Kingdom relations